NTSF may refer to:

 NTSF:SD:SUV:: (National Terrorism Strike Force: San Diego: Sport Utility Vehicle), an American comedy television show
 A common misspelling of NTFS (New Technology File System), a computer file system developed by Microsoft